Iron Man (vol. 4) is a comic book series published from January 2005 to January 2009 by Marvel Comics. It featured the superhero Iron Man for the first 32 issues and War Machine for the final three. It was the fourth series with this title to be published, following series that ran 1968–1996, 1996–1997, and 1998–2004. Over the course of its run, it was also published under different titles: The Invincible Iron Man (#1–12), and Iron Man: Director of S.H.I.E.L.D. (#15–35), with the change in indicia occurring after the events of Marvel's Civil War.

The first six issues comprised the "Extremis" storyline, which updated Iron Man's origin story and introduced the Extremis virus.

Creators

Writers 
 Warren Ellis: #1–6
 Daniel and Charles Knauf: #7–18, 21–28
 Christos Gage: #19–20, 33–35
 Stuart Moore: #29–32

Artists 
 Adi Granov: #1–6
 Patrick Zircher: #7–14
 Robert de la Torre: #15–18, 21–22, 25–26, 29–30
 Jackson Guice: #19–20, 23–24
 Carlo Pagulayan: #27, 29–32
 Steve Kurth: #30
 Sean Chen: #33–35

Collected editions 

The series has been collected into a number of individual volumes:
 Iron Man: Extremis (#1–6)
 Iron Man: Execute Program (#7–12)
 Civil War: Iron Man (#13–14; other Civil War tie–ins included)
 Iron Man: Director of S.H.I.E.L.D. (#15–18)
 World War Hulk: Marvel Universe (#19–20; other World War Hulk tie–ins included)
 Iron Man: Haunted (#21–28 and Annual #1)
 Iron Man: With Iron Hands (#29–32)
 Iron Man: Director of S.H.I.E.L.D.: The Complete Collection (#15–32)
 Secret Invasion: War Machine (#33–35)

Iron Man